Greenfield, also known as Petrolia, is a residential neighbourhood located in southwest Edmonton, Alberta, Canada.  While the official name of the neighbourhood is Greenfield, some residents will refer to the area as Petrolia.  There is a small shopping centre, Petrolia Shopping Centre, located in the neighbourhood.  The neighbourhood was named for Herbert Greenfield, the Premier of Alberta from 1921 to 1925, during the reign of the United Farmers of Alberta political party.

The neighbourhood is bounded on the east by 111 Street, on the west by 119 Street, on the north by 40 Avenue, and on the south by 34 Avenue.

The majority of residential construction in the neighbourhood occurred between 1960 and 1980, with roughly three out of four residences (77.0%) being constructed during the 1960s and another one in five residences (20.6%) being constructed during the 1970s.  The most common type of residence in the neighbourhood is single-family dwelling, which accounts for approximately nine out of ten (92%) of all residences.  The remaining residences are split equally between apartments in low-rise buildings (4%) and duplexes.  While all the apartments and half the duplexes are rented, the majority of residences (91%) are owner occupied.

There are three schools in the neighbourhood.  The Greenfield Public School is operated by the Edmonton Public School System and St. Stanislaus Catholic Elementary School is operated by the Edmonton Catholic School System.  In addition, there is the Academy for Maths and Science now located in the Petrolia Shopping Centre.

In addition to the Petrolia Shopping Centre, residents have good access along 111 Street to Southgate Centre.

111 Street also gives residents access to the new LRT stations at Southgate and Century Park.

The community is represented by the Greenfield Community League, established in 1967, which maintains a community hall, outdoor rink and tennis courts located at 114 Street and 38 Avenue.

Demographics 

The average household income in Greenfield is higher than the average household income in the larger City of Edmonton.

Surrounding neighbourhoods

See also 
 List of Alberta premiers
 Edmonton Federation of Community Leagues

References

External links 
 Greenfield Community League

Neighbourhoods in Edmonton